Live! On The Battlefield is a five-song EP by Nick Lowe & The Impossible Birds released in 1995 by Upstart Records. It contains Lowe's "I Live on a Battlefield", three live recordings and his cover version of Arthur Alexander's "In the Middle of It All". The live tracks were recorded in 1994-1995 by Lowe and his band, which consisted of Bill Kirchen, Paul "Bassman" Riley, Geraint Watkins and Robert Trehern.

Track listing
"I Live on a Battlefield" (Paul Carrack, Nick Lowe)
"36 Inches High" (Jim Ford)
"Without Love" (Nick Lowe)
"Dream Girl" (Jerry Crutchfield, Jim Crutchfield)
"In the Middle of It All" (Arthur Alexander)

Personnel
Nick Lowe – vocals,  guitar
Bill Kirchen – guitar, vocals
Paul Riley – bass guitar, vocals
Geraint Watkins – keyboard, vocals
Robert Treherne – drums, vocals

1995 EPs
Nick Lowe albums